Albert Guðmundsson (born 15 June 1997) is an Icelandic professional footballer who plays as a winger for  club Genoa.

Club career
Albert initially moved to the Netherlands joining SC Heerenveen in 2013. For the 2015–16 season, he signed for PSV and made his debut for Jong PSV in 2015.

On 31 January 2022, he joined Genoa in Italy.

International career
Albert played at China Cup 2017, where Iceland won silver medals.
 
In May 2018 he was named in the Iceland national team’s 23-man squad for the 2018 World Cup in Russia.

Personal life

Albert is from a family of footballers. His father is former international striker and TV commentator Guðmundur Benediktsson. Albert's mother is former international footballer Kristbjörg Ingadóttir, daughter of former international striker Ingi Björn Albertsson, who held the record for most goals in the Icelandic top division from 1987 until 2012.

The father of Ingi, and thus Albert's great-grandfather, was former Milan and Arsenal striker and later Minister of Finance Albert Guðmundsson, Iceland's first professional footballer. All four generations have scored for the Icelandic national team.

Career statistics

International

Scores and results list Iceland's goal tally first, score column indicates score after each Albert goal.

References

External links
 
 Albert Guðmundsson page at official PSV site
 

Living people
1997 births
Albert Gudmundsson
Association football wingers
Albert Gudmundsson
Albert Gudmundsson
2018 FIFA World Cup players
Albert Gudmundsson
Albert Gudmundsson
PSV Eindhoven players
Jong PSV players
AZ Alkmaar players
Jong AZ players
Genoa C.F.C. players
Eredivisie players
Eerste Divisie players
Serie A players
Serie B players
Albert Gudmundsson
Albert Gudmundsson
Expatriate footballers in the Netherlands
Albert Gudmundsson
Expatriate footballers in Italy